The San Angelo Colts was the primary name of the minor league baseball team based in San Angelo, Texas, United States in various seasons between 1921 and 1959.

History

The 1955 Colts won the Longhorn League championship under manager Pat McLaughlin.

The 1928 Red Snappers won the West Texas League Championship, finishing 69-47 under manager Earl "Red" Snapp, the teams namesake.

Notable players and managers include McLaughlin, Sam Harshaney, Mark Christman and Hillis Layne.

The first Colts team by that name also played in the West Texas League in 1922.

The 1957 Pampa Oilers moved to San Angelo partway through the season. The 1959 San Angelo Pirates moved to Rosewell, NM on June 9, 1959.

Notable alumni

Baseball Hall of Fame alumni
Willie Stargell (1959) Inducted, 1988

Notable alumni
 Mark Christman (1952)
 Red Snapp (1928)

References

Baseball teams established in 1948
Defunct minor league baseball teams
Sports in San Angelo, Texas
Baseball teams disestablished in 1957
1948 establishments in Texas
1957 disestablishments in Texas
Defunct baseball teams in Texas
Longhorn League teams